Two regiments of the British Army have been numbered the 115th Regiment of Foot:

115th Regiment of Foot (Royal Scotch Lowlanders), raised in 1761
115th Regiment of Foot (Prince William's), raised in 1794